Kiribati National Olympic Committee (IOC code: KIR) is the National Olympic Committee representing Kiribati. The same committee is also known as the Kiribati Commonwealth Games Association.

See also
Kiribati at the Olympics
Kiribati at the Commonwealth Games

References

External links 
IOC website
Official Facebook

Kiribati
Kiribati
Kiribati at the Olympics
Sports organizations established in 2002
Olympic